Narrative communication is a kind of a detached communication, where the person who is speaking is more involved in what he/she says rather than in the person who he/she is saying it to.

Description
Narrative communication is a way of communicating through telling stories. The stories are written or told and are named narratives. Most often, narratives are used to recount a story or in other cases to express an opinion or give information to circumscribe a situation like e.g. past events from the perspective of the storyteller. This use of narrative communication may be more effective than enumerating facts and statistics because it provides an experience people can understand and share. Narrative communication is one way, as in a speaker addressing an audience.

What is narrative communication?
Narrative communication is an account of events over a passage of time shared to one or many listeners. The time it takes to tell these narratives can vary. As per Kellas, “People build and communicate their relationships, cultures, and identities, in part through the stories they tell”  (Baxter, 241).  One may ask, why not call it “story telling theory”, instead of narrative theory?  Most communication scholars view this as the story being retold in a micro fashion which does not have extensive details. While the term 'narrative' encompasses a macro aspect than just story telling. For example, a story is generally describing or recounting a noteworthy event in someone’s life, whereas a narrative for example is not just the event but could describe multiple events to a whole sequence of someone in more detail than just telling one single story about the person. There are two types of narratives that create the biggest impact in our lives. First there is personal narrative, second there are professional narratives.

Personal
This concept explains that most of the narratives we use come from our personal experiences. When a friend or family member tells us about their day, and what has gone wrong to what is good, they are telling us how they want us to see them. History shows us that all cultures use some kind of narrative to form stories and dances to tell about their tribes and cultures. Same as family stories that are passed down from generation to generation.

Professional
This facet of narrative states that professionalism at the work place provides many outlets to produce narratives that express who we are (Alder & Rodmen, 2009 ). In the professional world we are exposed to many different cultures that shape how we share are narratives. This includes higher education and any organization we belong to.

See also
 Interpersonal communication
 Narrative paradigm
 Problematic integration theory

References
 Knobloch, L. K. (2008) Engaging Theories in Interpersonal Communication Multiple Perspectives. ( Leslie. A. Baxer, & Dawn O. Braithwaite Ed.). Los Angeles, CA: Sage Publications, Inc. 
 Griffin, E. (2010). Communication a first look at communication theory. New York, NY: McGraw-Hill 
 Alder, R, & Rodmen G.(2009) Understanding Human Communication. Oxford, NY: Oxford 

Human communication